Arkauti in Basque or Arcaute in Spanish is a village in Álava, Basque Country, Spain.

Geography 
Arkauti is located east of the municipality of Vitoria-Gasteiz.

Demographics 
In 2014 Arcaute had a total population of 84 people, 33 of them being men and 51 of them being women.

Populated places in Álava